Teddy Cream are an Australian duo consisting of Vincent Calderone and Brandon Mangion, who became friends in 2010 at the age of 13. The duo describe their music as "hard hitting, energetic and uplifting".

The duo's biggest commercial success came in 2017 with their remix of Daryl Braithwaite's "Horses" which peaked at number 55 on the Australian ARIA Charts in July 2017.

Biography
Teddy Cream's career begin with the duo DJing at underage events around Melbourne before starting to play at well known nightclubs around Victoria and Australia. The duo created Bootleg recordings of Smash Mouth, Pussycat Dolls and Mary J Blige have amassed hundreds of thousands of plays on Soundcloud and the support from some of the artists themselves. In 2015, Teddy Cream toured the UK and Croatia. The duo have performed with Steve Angello, Skrillex and Steve Aoki.

Discography

Singles
As lead and featured artist

References

Australian musical duos